Peter Deakin may refer to:

 Peter Deakin (British Army officer) (1910–1992), British general
 Peter Deakin (rugby) (1953–2003), rugby league and rugby union administrator
 Peter Deakin (cricketer) (born 1970), English cricketer
 Peter Deakin (footballer) (born 1938), English football inside forward
 Peter Deakins, British architect